John Comelond (fl. 1395) of Shepton Beauchamp, Somerset, was an English politician.

He was a Member (MP) of the Parliament of England for Wells in 1395.

References

14th-century births
Year of death missing
English MPs 1395
14th-century English politicians
People from Somerset